Dot and the Kangaroo is an 1899 Australian children's book written by Ethel C. Pedley about a little girl named Dot who gets lost in the Australian outback and is eventually befriended by a kangaroo and several other marsupials. The book was adapted into a stage production in 1924, and a film in 1977.

Plot introduction
A 5-year-old girl named Dot is lost in the outback after chasing a hare into the wood and losing sight of her home. She is approached by a red kangaroo who gives her some berries to eat. Upon eating the berries, Dot is able to understand the language of all animals, and she tells the kangaroo her plight. The kangaroo, who has lost her own joey, decides to help little Dot despite her own fear of humans. The book is filled with criticism on negative human interference in the wild in 1884.

Film adaptations

A film adaptation was released in 1977 directed by Yoram Gross. It combines animation with live action.

References

External links

PDF of the (public domain) text.

 (with original illustrations)

1899 Australian novels
Australian children's novels
Books published posthumously
Novels set in Australia
Children's novels about animals
Fictional kangaroos and wallabies
Fiction set in 1884
Australian novels adapted into films
1899 children's books
Angus & Robertson books